Advance Australia is a conservative political lobbying group launched in 2018 to counter the left wing activist group GetUp.

Structure and funding
The national director of Advance Australia was Gerard Benedet, a former Liberal Party staffer who led the organisation during the 2019 Australian federal election. Benedet stood down in September 2019, and was replaced by Liz Storer, former City of Gosnells councillor, and advisor to Liberal senator Zed Seselja.

High-profile backers include businessmen such as Maurice Newman, Kennards Self Storage managing director Sam Kennard, and Australian Jewish Association president David Adler. Other members of the advisory council include security specialist Sean Jacobs and journalist Kerry Wakefield. Queensland businessman James Power is also said to have been involved.

In its first four months, Advance Australia raised $395,000 and signed up 27,500 members. By May 2019, it had raised $1.7 million, according to Benedet. It raises money through donations on its website. Benedet says the membership is 60 per cent male and has an average age of about 50.

Advance Australia has been accused of astroturfing and being little more than a front for the Liberal Party, much as GetUp has been accused of being a front for the Australian Labor Party. Advance Australia's independence has yet to be tested, whereas GetUp has been cleared of ties to the Labor Party on three occasions by the Australian Electoral Commission.

Policies
The group says it opposes left-wing activists who it says are trying to change the Australian way of life. It decries radicalism and political correctness, and says, "Mainstream values have been the bedrock of Australia's growth as a western liberal democracy". It promotes family values, free markets, meritocracy, business, a Judeo-Christian heritage, a strong defence force and national borders. The group believes that anthropogenic climate change is a "hoax", with current national director Liz Storer describing the teaching of the predominant scientific view as "the other side of the story being shoved down their throats. It's already happening. The left have infiltrated our education systems. Any aware parent knows that their child is being taught the left's ideology."

Campaigns
The earliest campaigns of Advance Australia were online petitions to:
 keep Australia Day on January 26 to mark the anniversary of the First Fleet's arrival
 oppose plans by the Labor Party to scrap dividend imputation tax refunds for retirees with superannuation
 oppose targets set by the Labor Party to reduce carbon-dioxide emissions.

During the 2019 federal election campaign:
 costumed characters named Captain GetUp and Freddie Foreign Money appeared in electorates where GetUp was trying to unseat Liberals who had been key supporters of a leadership challenge by Peter Dutton
 a documentary-style series was launched on social media attacking GetUp.

During the 2022 federal election campaign:
 a truck featuring a giant billboard with a picture of Chinese leader and CCP general secretary Xi Jinping casting his primary vote for Labor. Beside him, the words "CCP (Chinese Communist Party) says vote Labor".
 corflute signs attacking David Pocock, an Independent candidate for a Senate seat in the 2022 Australian federal election. The signs implied that he was secretly a Greens candidate, by showing him in a "Superman" pose tearing his shirt to reveal the Greens logo. Pocock complained to the Australian Electoral Commission about this inference. Advance Australia agreed to stop displaying the signs at the request of the AEC, who believed they were in breach of the Commonwealth Electoral Act 1918.

Ongoing campaigns of Advance Australia are online petitions to:
 Oppose the Voice to Parliament.
 Oppose Net zero plans by the government.

Climate campaigns
Advance Australia's national director Liz Storer vowed upon her appointment in September 2019 to target the "militant advance of climate activism" and in particular, the protest group Extinction Rebellion who she described as "criminals who pose a menace to society".

In 2020, Advance Australia commenced a campaign aimed at children with an e-book titled "10 climate facts to expose the climate change hoax". The group are seeking to have their material distributed in classrooms. However the New South Wales Department of Education has stated it would not allow Advance Australia's in schools as they are not objective and would be in violation of the Controversial Issues in Schools policy. The Victorian Education Minister James Merlino has described the book as "rubbish", adding "this organisation is a front for a group of ill-informed climate change deniers".

Reception
The group has received a considerable amount of criticism in the Australian media. Jacobin magazine ridiculed Advance Australia's claim to non-partisanship and said that their "extensive personal and political connections of their members to the Liberal Party are public knowledge" while noting that they had received millions of dollars in donations from wealthy backers. In 2018, Crikey's Bernard Keane said that the idea of a "right-wing" GetUp! had been attempted many times with little success, and described Advance Australia's public backers as "a clutch of angry men" who were unlikely to succeed in their venture. In September 2020, Kishor Napier-Raman wrote in Crikey that the group was "fading into irrelevance" despite injections of funding from wealthy donors, while noting that despite their stated goal of providing a conservative counterweight to GetUp!, "Advance Australia are still playing catch up to GetUp when it comes to membership numbers, financial muscle, and sheer relevance".

References

External links
 Official website
 David Adler
 Sean Jacobs
 Sam Kennard

Australian political websites
Politics and technology
Internet-based activism
Organizations established in 2018
2018 establishments in Australia